Francisco Ortiz may refer to:

Francisco Ortiz de Vergara (1524–1574), Spanish conquistador and colonizer
Francisco Ortiz de la Renta (c.1726–c.1806), Puerto Rican mayor of Ponce
Francisco Ortiz Martín (1899–after 1924), Spanish Olympic diver
Francisco Ortiz Franco (1954–2004), Mexican journalist
Francisco "Paquito" Ortiz Rivas (born 1969), Spanish footballer and coach

See also
Frank Ortiz (disambiguation)